Twisted may refer to:

Film and television
 Twisted (1986 film), a horror film by Adam Holender starring Christian Slater
 Twisted (1996 film), a modern retelling of Oliver Twist
 Twisted, a 2011 Singapore Chinese film directed by Chai Yee Wei
 Twisted (2004 film), a thriller starring Ashley Judd and Andy Garcia
 Twisted, a parody musical by StarKid Productions
 Twisted (TV series), 2013
 "Twisted" (Star Trek: Voyager), a television episode
 Twisted (web series), an Indian erotic thriller web series

Software and games
 Twisted: The Game Show, a 1994 3DO game
 Twisted (software), an event-driven networking framework
 WarioWare: Twisted!, a 2005 game for the Game Boy Advance

Books
 Twisted (book), a short story collection by crime writer Jeffery Deaver
 More Twisted, a second short story collection by Deaver
 Twisted, a novel by Laurie Halse Anderson
 Twisted, a Pretty Little Liars novel by Sara Shepard

Brands
 Creme Egg Twisted, a chocolate bar

Music 

 Twisted (musical), a parody of Disney's Aladdin

Record labels
 Twisted Records (UK), a record label specializing in psychedelic trance
 Twisted Records (U.S.), an electronic music record label

Albums
 Twisted (Del Amitri album), 1995
 Twisted (Hallucinogen album), 1995

Songs
 "Twisted" (Annie Ross song), a 1952 jazz song, recorded by Lambert, Hendricks & Ross and covered by Bette Midler, Joni Mitchell and others
 "Twisted" (Brian McFadden song)
 "Twisted" (Keith Sweat song)
 "Twisted" (Stevie Nicks song)
 "Twisted" (Vandalism song)
 "Twisted" (Wayne G song)
 "Twisted", a song by Avail from their 1992 album Satiate
 "Twisted", a song by Carrie Underwood from her 2007 album Carnival Ride
 "Twisted", a song by Dio from their 1990 album Lock Up the Wolves
 "Twisted", a song by Heidi Montag from her 2010 album Superficial
 "Twisted", a song by Quiet Riot from their 1995 album Down to the Bone
 "Twisted", a song by Phinehas from their 2013 album The Last Word Is Yours to Speak
 "Twisted", a song by Skylar Grey, Eminem & Yelawolf from the 2014 album Shady XV
 "Twisted", a song by rapper Tiffany Foxx
 "Twisted (Everyday Hurts)", a song by Skunk Anansie from their 1996 album Stoosh

See also
 Twiztid, an American hip hop duo
 Twisted Pixel Games, an America game developer
 Twist (disambiguation)
 Twister (disambiguation)

sv:Twisted